was a two-hour Broadway style stage production at the opening ceremony of The 25th National Cultural Festival Okayama 2010 that aired nationally multiple times as a Japanese TV special on NHK in 2010.

Cast
 Shin Koyamada as Seinen Makibi
 Chika Kanô as Shizuku
 Mao Eguchi as Arashi
 Yu Funaki as Arashi
 Miki Hayashi as Arashi
 Serina Hayashi as Arashi
 Erika Inukai as Arashi
 Takuro Kashino as Arashi
 Mayumi Kataoka as Arashi
 Kanako Katayama as Arashi
 Sayo Kawaguchi as Arashi
 Sayaka Kawakami as Arashi
 Ayumi Kiguchi as Arashi
 Kazusa Matsuyama as Arashi
 Akiko Miyake as Arashi
 Nao Miyake as Arashi
 Sayaka Motoi as Arashi
 Mari Murakami as Arashi
 Miyuki Nishiyama as Arashi
 Yuki Nose as Arashi
 Kana Oguchi as Arashi
 Chie Otsubo as Arashi
 Chinatsu OtsuboArashi
 Mayuka Takimoto as Arashi
 Nao Tanabe as Arashi
 Kouga Tsuchitani as Arashi
 Miyuki Ueshima as Arashi
 Wataru Yabe as Arashi
 Kenta Yamamoto as Arashi
 Hiromi Yoshida as Arashi
 Natsumi Yoshikawa as Arashi

Production

Casting
The story of show was based on the history of Okayama Prefecture so all of the cast and performers were selected from those who were based in Okayama or from Okayama. The executive producers and the representatives of the Okayama Prefectural Government were considering a list of famous Japanese actors and celebrities from Okayama Prefecture, including Shin Koyamada, Joe Odagiri, Koshi Inaba and many others for the starring character Seinen Makibi. After the long period of examinations, Koyamada was chosen to star by the executive producers and Okayama Prefecture Governor Masahiro Ishii who was also a chairman of the executive committee of the production, although Koyamada is from Okayama, but resides in Hollywood. During the production in 2010, Koyamada was officially appointed as an International Goodwill Ambassador of the Okayama Prefectural Government by the then-Governor Masahiro Ishii. The female co-star was appointed to Chika Kanô, a former veteran Takarazuka Revue.

Preparation
The development of the show took over 10 years because of the budget issue of the Okayama Prefecture, but eventually got it approved by the governor and Okayama Prefectural Assembly and greenlit by the co-host Agency for Cultural Affairs. Kanzaki Takenori was appointed as the executive producer for the show. Since Koyamada has been based in Los Angeles, he had to fly back and forth to Okayama Prefecture to rehearse his scenes with other local casts and promote the show through commercials and events in Japan. The famous national dance champion team of the Soja Minami Senior High School based in Sōja, Okayama was brought in to rehearse with Koyamada, who had to incorporate his martial arts movements with their dancing calligraphy for their scenes together.

Distribution
The show was first aired live nationally on NHK on October 30, 2010, and rebroadcast multiple times after that on NHK because it was well received. Okayama Prefecture has produced the DVD and  distributed to those who were involved in the show.

See also
 The National Cultural Festival
 The 25th National Cultural Festival Okayama 2010

References

External links
 
 

Japanese television specials